İzzet Çelik (born 20 June 2004) is a Turkish professional footballer who plays as a winger for Bayrampaşa on loan from Adana Demirspor.

Career
A youth product of Adana Demirspor, Çelik began his senior career with the team in 2020 at the age of 16. He made his professional debut with Adana Demirspor in a 4–0 Süper Lig win over Gaziantep on 25 September 2021.

References

External links
 
 

2004 births
Sportspeople from Adana
Living people
Turkish footballers
Association football wingers
Adana Demirspor footballers
Bayrampaşaspor footballers
Süper Lig players
TFF First League players
TFF Second League players
TFF Third League players